Victor Robert Fuchs (born January 31, 1924) is an American health economist.

Career
He is an emeritus professor at Stanford University. Since 1962, he has been a research associate at the National Bureau of Economic Research and is the co-director of the FRESH-Thinking Project and CASBS at Stanford University. Fuchs was elected to the American Academy of Arts and Sciences in 1982 and to the American Philosophical Society in 1990. In 1995, he served as president of the American Economic Association. In 2001, he was recipient of the John R. Commons Award, given by the economics honor society Omicron Delta Epsilon.

Relative poverty rate 
Fuchs is credited with introducing the relative poverty rate, calculated as the fraction of members of a society earning less than 50% of the median income.

Comparison of healthcare in Canada and US
In 1990 Fuchs published a paper together with James S. Hahn, entitled How Does Canada Do it? – A comparison of Expenditures for Physicians' Services in the United States and Canada. It discusses the differences in the Canadian and US healthcare spending patterns and also discusses why healthcare expenditures are so much higher in the United States. Fuchs and Hahn found that the higher US expenditures were entirely based on 234 percent higher fees for services than Canada even though there are more physicians per capita in Canada. That shows that the typical view of Canada saving money by delivering fewer services is false and that the insurance setup, being a single-payer system, is what gives it the edge.

Differences between the United States and Canada on fees, spending, and use are shown. The accentuating difference begins with the disparity in health care coverage. Canada operates under a universal health care system, which covers majority of their residents. On the other hand, the United States operates under a fragmented multi-payer system that fails to provide coverage for many Americans. Moreover, the lack of correspondence between both countries regarding health care coverage validates part of the narrative reported in the study, which concluded that the US spent more on physicians' services than Canada.

Furthermore, the study also suggests that higher expenditures in the US is a function of many factors including higher wages earned by US physicians, the difference of physicians on demand, billing costs, quality of health care, physicians' workload, and superfluous amenities. Notably, the factors bring to question the underlying differences in health care delivery, and the authors reported more general practitioners in Canada per capita. The limited role of general practitioners in the US compared to Canada may imply that Canadian physicians are "more inclined to recommend additional evaluation and management services."

Published books
 Who Shall Live? Health, Economics, and Social Choice (1975)
 The Future of Health Policy (1998)

References

1924 births
Living people
Health economists
Columbia University alumni
New York University alumni
Presidents of the American Economic Association
Stanford University faculty
Members of the National Academy of Medicine